Assia Khalfaoui (born 24 March 2001) is a French rugby union player. She plays for the France women's national rugby union team and Stade Bordelais as a prop forward.

Personal life
She was born in Pont-du-Casse in the Lot-et-Garonne department in south-western France. She signed for Stade Bordelais aged 18 after playing initially for SU Agen Lot-et-Garonne.

Career
She made her international debut for France on the 27 March, 2022 in Grenoble, in a 39-6 French victory against Italy. She was named in France's team for the delayed 2021 Rugby World Cup in New Zealand.

References

2001 births
Living people
French female rugby union players